Nyam (also known as Nyambolo) is an Afro-Asiatic language spoken in one village in Nigeria.

Notes 

West Chadic languages
Languages of Nigeria
Endangered Afroasiatic languages